Latouchella is an extinct genus of marine invertebrate animal, that is considered to be a mollusk and which may be a sea snail, a gastropod. It is a helcionellid from the Tommotian epoch of what is now Siberia.  Its tightly coiled, spiral shell contains a number of low "walls" running up the front surface of the interior; these would have directed water currents within its shell.  Between these walls are a series of furrows, parallel to the shell's aperture, giving casts of the internal structure the appearance of a railway line, with sleepers (created by furrows) tying together paired rails that run towards the apex of the shell.

Description
This genus had a curved, segmented shell, and it is often reconstructed as a snail-like creature.

Older taxonomy 
The taxonomy of the genus Latouchella was originally like this: class Helcionelloida, order Helcionellida, superfamily Helcionelloidea, family Helcionellidae.

2005 taxonomy 
The taxonomy of the Gastropoda by Bouchet & Rocroi, 2005 categorizes Latouchella in the family Coreospiridae in the superfamilia Scenelloidea within the 
Paleozoic molluscs of uncertain systematic position.

Latouchella was a type genus in the family Latouchellidae Golikov & Starobogatov, 1989, however Latouchellidae is a synonym of Coreospiridae.

2006-2007 taxonomy 
The 2006-2007 taxonomy of the genus Latouchella is like this: class Helcionelloida, subclass Archaeobranchia, order Helcionelliformes, superfamily Helcionelloidea, family Coreospiridae.

Species 
Species in the genus Latouchella include:
 Latouchella costata (type)
 L. accordionata
 L. adelocosma
 L. adunca
 L. alicae
 L. arcuata
 L. arguta
 L. burlingi
 L. dimicostata
 L. holmdalense
 L. iacobinica
 L. korobokovi
 L. merino
 L. ostenfeldense
 L. pearylandica
 L. pocatelloensis
 L. sonlingpoensis
 L. taijiangensis
 ? Latouchella memorabilis Missarzhevsky in Rozanov et al., 1969
 ? Latouchella orientalis

See also
Yochelcionella

References

Notes
Gubanov, Alexander P.; Peel, John S.. Redescription of the type species of Latouchella Cobbold, 1921 (Mollusca) from the Lower Cambrian of Comley, England. GFF 1998 03.
Gubanov, Alexander P.; Peel, John S.. Oelandiella, the earliest Cambrian helcionelloid mollusc from Siberia. Palaeontology April 1999.
Brock, Glenn A.. Middle Cambrian molluscs from the southern New England Fold Belt, New South Wales, Australia. Geobios 1998.
Runnegar, Bruce; Jell, Peter A.. Australian Middle Cambrian molluscs and their bearing on early molluscan evolution. Alcheringa: An Australasian Journal of Palaeontology 1976 01.
 E.S. Cobbold. 1921. The Cambrian horizons of Comley (Shropshire) and their Brachiopoda, Pteropoda, Gasteropoda and etc. Quarterly Journal of the Geological Society of London 76:325-386

Fossils of Russia
Coreospiridae
Cambrian molluscs
Fossil taxa described in 1921
Paleozoic life of British Columbia
Paleozoic life of Nova Scotia